The Trio Fontenay was a German classical music piano trio which performed worldwide and recorded much of the significant piano trio repertoire between the years 1980 and 2006.

Formation
The Trio Fontenay was formed in Hamburg in 1980. The original members of the trio were Wolf Harden, pianist; Michael Mücke, violinist; and Niklas Schmidt, cellist. The name "Fontenay" is old French for "source" and "fantasy", and is also the name of the street near the Hamburg Conservatory where the ensemble first met to practice. An important early influence on the group's interpretations came from classes they attended in Cologne which were taught by the Amadeus Quartet.

Concert career
In the 1980s they quickly developed an active concert schedule, including regular appearances at major concert halls and festivals in Europe. In 1986 they made their American debut.  Subsequently the group toured North and South America, Australia and the Far East. For a time the ensemble was named "trio in residence" at Théâtre du Châtelet and was based in Paris. In the 1995-1996 season they performed the complete Beethoven cycle at Paris’s Théâtre Chatelet, London’s Wigmore Hall, Berlin’s Schauspielhaus, Amsterdam’s Concertgebouw, and in Hamburg, Munich, and Cologne. Their recording of these works received the 1994 Preis der deutschen Schallplattenkritik [German Record Critics Award]. In 1998 the cellist Niklas Schmidt was replaced  by Jens-Peter Maintz. The musicians decided to disband Trio Fontenay in February 2006.

Audio recordings
The ensemble recorded music of Beethoven, Brahms, Debussy, Dvořák, Fauré, Haydn, Ives, Mendelssohn, Messiaen, Mozart, Rachmaninoff, Ravel, Roslavets, Schubert, Schumann, and Turina for Teldec, Denon, EMI, Philips, and K&K. The recordings listed here were made with Niklas Schmidt as the cellist, unless otherwise noted, and are listed in chronological order.

Mendelssohn: Piano Trio No. 1 in D minor, Op. 49
Rachmaninoff: Trio élégiaque No. 2 in D minor, Op. 9

Brahms: Piano Trio No. 3 in C-minor, Op. 101
Dvorak: Piano Trio No. 3 in F minor, B130

Schubert:
•Piano Trio No. 1 in B-flat major, D898
•Piano Trio No. 2 in E-flat major, D929
•Piano Trio in B-flat major (Sonata in one movement), D28
•Notturno in E-flat major, D897

Brahms: Piano Trio No. 2 in C major, Op. 87
Dvorak: Piano Trio No. 1 in B-flat major, B51

Mendelssohn:
•Piano Trio No. 1 in D minor, Op. 49
•Piano Trio No. 2 in C minor, Op. 66

Mozart:
•Piano Trio in G major, K. 496
•Piano Trio in B-flat major, K. 502
•Piano Trio in C major, K. 548
•Piano Trio in G major, K. 564
•Divertimento in B-flat major, K. 254

Brahms: Piano Trio No. 1 in B, Op. 8
Ives: Piano Trio

Brahms: Piano Trio in A major, Op. posth.
Schumann: Piano Trio No. 1 in D minor, Op. 63

Brahms: Piano Trio No. 1 in B, Op. 8
Brahms: Piano Trio No. 2 in C major, Op. 87
Brahms: Piano Trio No. 3 in C-minor, Op. 101
Brahms: Piano Trio in A major, Op. posth.

Ravel: Piano Trio
Debussy: Premier trio in G
Fauré: Piano Trio in D minor, Op. 120

Messiaen: Quatuor pour la fin du temps

Dvorak:
Piano Trio No. 1 in B-flat major, Op. 21, B51
Piano Trio No. 3 in F minor, Op. 65, B130
Piano Trio No. 4 in E minor, Op. 90, B166
Piano Trio No. 2 in G minor, Op. 26, B56

Beethoven:
•Piano Trio No. 1, Op. 1 no. 1 in E-flat major
•Piano Trio No. 2, Op. 1 no. 2 in G major
•Piano Trio No. 3, Op. 1 no. 3 in Cminor
•Piano Trio No. 4, Op. 11 in B-flat major
•Piano Trio No. 5, Op. 70 no. 1 in D major, "Ghost"
•Piano Trio No. 6, Op. 70 no. 2 in E-flat major
•Piano Trio No. 7, Op. 97 in B-flat major, "Archduke" 
•Piano Trio No. 10, Op. 44 in E-flat major (Theme and 14 variations)
•Piano Trio No. 11, Op. 121 (Variations on "Ich bin der Schneider Kakadu")

Beethoven:
•Triple Concerto in C major, Op. 56
•Piano Trio No. 5, Op. 70 no. 1 in D major, "Ghost"

Schumann:
•Piano Trio No. 2 in F major, Op. 80
•Piano Trio No. 3 in G minor, Op. 110

Schubert:
•Piano Trio No. 1 in B-flat major, D898
•Piano Trio in B-flat major (Sonata in one movement), D28
•Piano Trio No. 2 in E-flat major, D929
•Notturno in E-flat major, D897

Beethoven:
•Scottish Songs, Op. 108
No. 2: "Sunset"
No. 3: "Oh! sweet were the hours"
No. 5: "The sweetest lad was Jamie"
No. 13: "Come fill, fill, my good fellow"
No. 20: "Faithfu' Johnie"
No. 24: "Again, my lyre"
•Irish Songs, WoO 152
No. 1: "The Return to Ulster"
No. 5: "The Massacre of Glencoe"
No. 10: "The Deserter"
No. 21: "Morning a cruel turmoiler is."
•Irish Songs, WoO 153
No. 9: "The kiss, dear maid, thy lip has left"
No. 11: "When far from the home"
•Irish Songs, WoO 154
No. 1: "The Elfin Fairies"
No. 4 "The Pulse of an Irishman"
No. 5: "Oh! who, my dear Dermot"
•Welsh Songs, WoO 155
No. 12: "Waken lords and ladies gay"
No. 15: "When mortals all to rest retire"
No. 21: "Cupid's Kindness"
No. 25: "The Parting Kiss"
No. 26: "Good Night"

 Haydn:
•Keyboard Trio No. 18 (No. 32) in A major, Hob. XV:18
•Keyboard Trio No. 21 (No. 35) in C major, Hob. XV:21
•Keyboard Trio No. 25 (No. 39) in G major, "Gipsy Trio," Hob. XV:25
•Keyboard Trio No. 30 (No. 42) in E-flat major, Hob. XV:30

 Roslavets:
•Piano Trio No. 2 (1920)
•Piano Trio No. 3 (1921)
•Piano Trio No. 3 (1921)

 Turina: Piano Trio No. 1, Op. 35
 Beethoven: Piano Trio No. 6, Op. 70 No. 2 in E-flat major

Video recording
 Mozart: Piano Trio in B-flat major, K. 502
 Henze: Kammersonate (1948; revised 1963)
 Brahms: Piano Trio No. 2 in C major, Op. 87

Notes

Chamber music groups
Musical groups established in 1980
Piano trios